Plon may refer to:
 Plön, the district seat of the Plön district in Schleswig-Holstein, Germany
 Plon, Pomeranian Voivodeship, a village in Poland
 Plon (publisher), a French book publishing company